The TransJakarta Corridor 5 is the TransJakarta bus rapid transit route which operates from Kampung Melayu Bus Terminal (East Jakarta) to Ancol (North Jakarta). The roads that corridor 5 takes are along Jalan Gunung Sahari, Jalan Pasar Senen, Jalan Kramat Raya, Jalan Salemba Raya, Jalan Matraman Raya, Jalan Jatinegara West/East and arrive at Kampung Melayu Terminal. In this corridor there are railroad lines such as Jalan Matraman Raya (Manggarai-Jatinegara Railway Line), Jalan Gunung Sahari (Rajawali-Kampung Bandan Railway Line) and (Jakarta Kota-Tanjung Priok Railway Line). From the Pademangan BRT Station to Jatinegara Market, several stations are close to the KRL Commuterline railway station.

After having a trial run on December 2006, Corridor 5 began its operation on January 27, 2007, along with corridor 4, 6, and 7.

List of BRT Stations 
 Pasar Jatinegara 1 will serve as terminus temporarily from 16 February 2023 until the completion of renovated Kampung Melayu BRT station.
 Currently, all bus stops are served by buses 24 hours a day. Night corridor M5 extends the line to PGC 2 following corridor 7's route.
 Kampung Melayu only serves Corridor 5C towards Harmoni and 5D towards Ancol.
 Station indicated by a -> sign has a one way service towards Kampung Melayu only.
 Italic text indicates that the BRT station is temporarily closed for renovation.

Cross-corridor routes

Corridor 5C (PGC 1–Juanda) 
 Station indicated by a <- sign has a one way service towards PGC 1 only. Stations indicated by a -> sign has a one way service towards Monas only.
 Italic text indicates that the BRT station is temporarily closed for renovation.
 Even though it was designated as PGC 1 - National Monument (Monas), since August 15 2022, 5C route fleets were still serving up to the Harmoni Central BRT Station to anticipate the limited occupancy of the Monas BRT Station until March 3, 2023. However, there has been no official statement regarding the extension of the 5C route to Harmoni Central. Starting March 4, 2023, Corridor 5C began to temporarily extend the line to the Juanda BRT station.

Corridor 5D (PGC 1–Ancol) 

 Stations indicated by a <- sign has a one way service towards PGC 1 only.
 Italic text indicates that the BRT station is temporarily closed for renovation.

Corridor 5E (Penas Kalimalang–Matraman 2)

Corridor 5H (Harmoni Central–Ancol)

Corridor 5K (Kampung Melayu–Kota) 

 Stations indicated by a <- sign has a one way service towards Kampung Melayu only.
 Italic text indicates that the BRT Station is temporarily closed for renovation.

Fleets 

 Zhongtong Bus LCK6180GC, red-yellow (TJ, only operates at Corridor 5, 5C, 5D and 5H)
 Zhongtong Bus LCK6180GC Euro 5, putih-biru tua (PPD, only operates at Corridor 5, 5D and 5E)
 Yutong ZK6180HGC, orange-red (TJ)
 Ankai HFF6180G02D, orange-red (TJ)
 Hino RK8 R260, blue (PPD, only operates at Corridor 5, 5C, 5D, 5E and 5H)
 Hino RK8 R260, blue (BMP, night bus (22:00 - 05:00) (Ancol-PGC 1))
 Scania K310IB 6x2, white-blue (MYS, only operates at Corridor 5E and 5K)
 Mercedes-Benz OH 1626 NG A/T, white-blue (MYS, only operates at Corridor 5E and 5K)
 Volvo B11R 6×2 A/T, white-blue (only operates at Corridor 5, 5C, 5D, 5H and 5K)

Depots 
 Cawang (TJ)
 Pesing (TJ)
 Cijantung (MYS)
 Cawang (PPD)
 Klender (PPD)
 Pulo Gadung (PPD)
 Klender (SAF)

Incidents 

 On July 3, 2015, one of the bus fleets that serves corridor 5 was on fire when the bus stoped at the Salemba UI BRT Station. There were no casualties.
 On 24 May 2017, two explosions occurred at the in Kampung Melayu BRT Station and bus terminal. The Police confirmed that the explosions were caused by multiple explosive devices found in the toilet and in another part of the terminal. The bombings killed five people: three policemen and two attackers. The 11 injured people were taken to multiple hospitals across the Eastern Jakarta area.
 On July 16, 2022, a middle-aged woman died when she was hit and run over by a bus on the Transjakarta route near the Kramat Sentiong NU BRT Station. The victim suffered serious head and hand injuries and the driver who hit him was named as the suspect.
 On September 3, 2022, a MetroTrans non-BRT bus with route 5M (Kampung Melayu–Tanah Abang via Cikini) got stuck under the viaduct, the former Gunung Antang Railway Bridge near the Matraman Baru BRT Station. The bus was damaged at the top causing smoke suspected to be freon. The bus driver allegedly forgot that there is not much difference between the bridge and the road. There were no casualties and the traffic around the scene also remained smooth and unaffected.

See also

TransJakarta
List of TransJakarta corridors

References

External links 
 

TransJakarta
Bus routes